The Marshall Islands requires its residents to register their motor vehicles and display vehicle registration plates. Current plates are North American standard 6 × 12 inches (152 × 305 mm).

References

Marshall Islands
Transportation in the Marshall Islands
Marshall Islands transportation-related lists